Travis Wade Swaggerty Jr. (born August 19, 1997) is an American professional baseball outfielder for the Pittsburgh Pirates of Major League Baseball (MLB).

Amateur career
Swaggerty attended Denham Springs High School in Denham Springs, Louisiana, and played on their baseball team. As a senior, he batted .451 and was named to the Louisiana Sports Writers Association's Class 5A All State team. He was not drafted in the 2015 Major League Baseball draft and enrolled at the University of South Alabama where he played college baseball.

As a freshman in 2016 at South Alabama, Swaggerty appeared in 59 games, compiling a .303 batting average with four home runs, 27 RBIs, 12 doubles and 20 stolen bases. In 2017, as a sophomore, he appeared in and started 58 games, slashing .356/.484/.571 with 11 home runs, 60 RBIs, and 19 stolen bases. After the season, was named to the All-Sun Belt First Team. That summer, Swaggerty played for the USA Baseball Collegiate National Team where he batted .328/.449/.406 in 19 games, and also briefly played collegiate summer baseball with the Brewster Whitecaps of the Cape Cod Baseball League. He was named a first-team preseason All-American by Baseball America, D1Baseball.com, and Perfect Game prior to his junior season along with being named the 2018 Sun Belt Preseason Player of the Year. He finished his junior season batting .296 with 13 home runs, 38 RBIs, and a .455 on-base percentage over 57 games. He was named to the All-Sun Belt First Team for the second year in a row.

Professional career
Swaggerty was selected by the Pittsburgh Pirates with the tenth overall selection of the 2018 Major League Baseball draft. He signed for $4.4 million and was assigned to the West Virginia Black Bears of the Class A Short Season New York–Penn League, with whom he was named an All-Star. After hitting .288 with four home runs and 15 RBIs in 36 games for the Black Bears, he was promoted to the West Virginia Power of the Class A South Atlantic League in August. He finished the season with the Power, batting .129 with one home run and five RBIs in 16 games. Swaggerty spent 2019 with the Bradenton Marauders of the Class A-Advanced Florida State League and was named an All-Star. Over 121 games, he slashed .265/.347/.381 with nine home runs, forty RBIs, and 23 stolen bases. He did not play a minor league game in 2020 after the season was cancelled due to the COVID-19 pandemic.

To begin the 2021 season, Swaggerty was assigned to the Indianapolis Indians of the Triple-A East. On May 27, he was placed on the 60-day injured list after dislocating his right shoulder. He later had season-ending surgery. Over 41 at-bats prior to the injury, he hit .220 with three home runs and seven RBIs. On November 19, 2021, the Pirates selected Swaggerty's contract and added him to their 40-man roster. He returned to the Indians to begin the 2022 season. In early May, he was placed on the injured list with a concussion but was activated just a week later.

On June 4, 2022, it was announced that the Pirates would be promoting Swaggerty to the major leagues. At the time of his promotion, he was batting .280 with four home runs, 22 RBIs, and two triples over 35 games. He started in center field in a game against the Detroit Tigers on June 7, making his MLB debut. Swaggerty recorded his first major league hit against Atlanta Braves pitcher Max Fried on June 9. He was optioned back to Indianpolis on June 13.

Personal life
During Swaggerty's junior year at the University of South Alabama, his partner Peyton transferred to the school. Shortly after he was drafted, she was diagnosed with and treated for thyroid cancer. The couple married in December 2020 and they welcomed their first child, a daughter, in September 2021.

References

External links

South Alabama Jaguars bio

1997 births
Living people
People from Covington, Louisiana
Baseball players from Louisiana
Major League Baseball outfielders
Pittsburgh Pirates players
South Alabama Jaguars baseball players
Brewster Whitecaps players
West Virginia Black Bears players
West Virginia Power players
Bradenton Marauders players
Indianapolis Indians players